The Organization of Arab Petroleum Exporting Countries (OAPEC) is a multi-governmental organization headquartered in Kuwait which coordinates energy policies among oil-producing Arab nations. OAPEC's primary objective is safeguarding the cooperation of numerous members in various aspects of economic activity within the oil industry as well as maintaining strong relations among themselves; to provide legitimate means to preserve the members' individual and collective efforts within the industry; unite on-going efforts for the procurement of oil; provide access to consumer markets on fair and reasonable terms; and provide conditions, adequate capital, and experience of investors in the oil industry.

History

On 9 January 1968, three of the then–most conservative Arab oil states – Kuwait, Libya, and Saudi Arabia – agreed at a conference in Beirut, Lebanon to found the Organization of Arab Petroleum Exporting Countries, aiming to separate the production and sale of oil from politics in the wake of the halfhearted 1967 oil embargo in response to the Six-Day War. Such use of the economic weapon of oil embargo in the struggle against Israel had been regularly proposed at Arab Petroleum Congresses, but it took the Six-Day War for the embargo to happen. However, Saudi Arabia's oil production was up by 9% that year, and the main embargo lasted only ten days and was completely ended by the Khartoum Conference.

OAPEC was originally intended to be a conservative Arab political organization which, by restricting membership to countries whose main export was oil, would exclude governments seen as radical – such as those of Egypt and Algeria. This organizational exclusivity was bolstered by an additional rule in the organization's charter requiring the three founders' approval of all new members. The original aim was to control the economic weapon of potential oil embargo and prevent its use caused by popular emotion. Iraq initially declined to join, preferring to work under the umbrella of the Arab League, considering OAPEC too conservative. Equally the three founders considered Iraq too radical to be desirable as a member. However, by early 1972, the criterion for admission had changed to oil being a significant source of revenue (rather than the principal source) of a prospective member nation; and Algeria, Iraq, Syria and Egypt had been admitted. Consequently, OAPEC became a much more activist organization, contrary to the original intention.

The 1973 oil crisis was a turning point for the organization. In October of that year, the forces of Egypt and Syria attempted to overwhelm the state of Israel in an offensive later known as the Yom Kippur War. On 16 October, ten days after the war's start, Kuwait hosted separate meetings of both OAPEC and the Persian Gulf members of OPEC, including Iran. OAPEC resolved to cut oil production by 5% monthly "until the Israeli forces are completely evacuated from all the Arab territories occupied in the June 1967 war". The embargo would last for some five months before it was lifted in March 1974 after negotiations at the Washington Oil Summit. The embargo's after-effects would linger through the rest of the decade and beyond. For the oil-exporting countries, the embargo was the first experience of leveraging their collective production for political gains. A number of the member nations would use this sense of control to renegotiate the contracts they had made with the companies that had discovered and exploited their resources. The vastly increased revenues would prove addictive, and a unified OAPEC oil embargo was never again possible.

In 1979, Egypt was expelled from OAPEC for signing the Camp David Accords, although it was readmitted a decade later.

In 1982, the Arab League's Arab Petroleum Congress (founded in 1959) merged into OAPEC's Arab Energy Conference (founded in 1979), which has continued to meet periodically through at least 2014.

OAPEC is regarded as a regional, specialized international organization focusing on organizing cooperation in oil development, collective projects, and regional integration.

Organizational structure 
OAPEC consists of the Council of Ministers that holds the supreme authority over the Executive Bureau, the General Secretariat, and the Judicial Tribunal. The Council of Ministers is formed by each member state's minister of petroleum and they work together to construct general policy and ensure the organization's goals and actions are being achieved and implemented. The Executive Bureau assists the Council of Ministers by meet at least three times a year to review the budget, approve staff regulations, and develops an agenda for the Council of Ministers depending on their analyses of the organizations activities. One senior official from each member state serves on the Executive Bureau. The General Secretariat consists of the Secretary General's Office, as well as four departments: Finance and Administrative Affairs; Information and Library; Economics; and Technical Affairs. The Economics Department and the Technical Affairs Department form the Arab Center for Energy Studies that was established in 1983. The Judicial Tribunal mitigates disputes between member states; interpretations of the OAPEC Agreement; disputes with a petroleum company operating in its member states' territory, and anything else that falls into OAPEC's jurisdiction or that the Council of Ministers submits to the tribunal. The Judicial Tribunal must unevenly consist of at least seven and no more than eleven judges from Arab countries. The tribunal's judgments are final and binding, and will be enforceable within the territories of residing members.

Member countries 
As of December 2020, OAPEC has 11 members countries, 6 of which are also OPEC members:
  Algeria
  Bahrain
  Egypt
  Iraq
  Kuwait
  Libya
  Qatar
  Saudi Arabia
  Syria
  United Arab Emirates
  Tunisia

See also 
 List of countries by oil production
 Arab lobby in the United States

Footnotes

External links 
 OAPECORG.ORG website
 OAPEC information from Saudi Arabia
 OPEC website
 OPEC and OAPEC, from Kuwait
 Will Iraq Be a Global Gas Pump? The (Re)Making of a Petro-State by Michael T. Klare, The Huffington Post, 14 July 2009

Foreign relations of Algeria
Foreign relations of Bahrain
Foreign relations of Egypt
Foreign relations of Iraq
Foreign relations of Kuwait
Foreign relations of Libya
Foreign relations of Qatar
Foreign relations of Saudi Arabia
Foreign relations of Syria
Foreign relations of Tunisia
Foreign relations of the United Arab Emirates
International energy organizations
Petroleum organizations
Petroleum politics
Intergovernmental organizations